Ashleigh Barty defeated Danielle Collins in the final, 6–3, 7–6(7–2) to win the women's singles tennis title at the 2022 Australian Open. She became the first home player to win an Australian Open singles title since Chris O'Neil in 1978. It was Barty's third major singles title, and she won the title without losing a set, dropping just three service games during the tournament. 
The final also marked Barty's last professional appearance, as she announced her retirement from the sport two months later.

Naomi Osaka was the defending champion, but lost to Amanda Anisimova in the third round.

Barty retained the world No. 1 singles ranking after Aryna Sabalenka and Barbora Krejčíková lost in the fourth round and quarterfinals, respectively. Collins entered the WTA top 10 rankings for the first time by reaching the final.

Alizé Cornet reached her first major singles quarterfinal on her 63rd main-draw appearance, surpassing Tamarine Tanasugarn's all-time record, who reached her maiden quarterfinal at the 2008 Wimbledon Championships on her 45th attempt.
Kaia Kanepi becomes the first Estonian to reach the quarterfinals at all four majors after her victory over second seed Aryna Sabalenka in the fourth round.
For the first time since 1997, neither Venus nor Serena Williams participated in the Australian Open.

This was the last singles major for former world No. 4 and 2011 US Open champion Samantha Stosur, who announced her retirement from the discipline. She lost to Anastasia Pavlyuchenkova in the second round.

Seeds

Draw

Finals

Top half

Section 1

Section 2

Section 3

Section 4

Bottom half

Section 5

Section 6

Section 7

Section 8

Championship match statistics

Seeded players
The following are the seeded players. Seedings are based on WTA rankings as of 10 January 2022. Rank and points before are as of 17 January 2022.

Unlike in the men's tournament, points from the 2021 women's singles tournament will be dropped at the end of this year's tournament in addition to the 2020 women's singles tournament as player's points will also be dropped as usual. The "better of 2020/2021 points" for January, February and March were announced by the WTA in September 2021, even though the 2021 tournament was held three weeks later than in 2022. Accordingly, the higher of each player's 2020 or 2021 points will be replaced by her 2022 points at the end of the tournament.

† The player did not qualify for the tournament in either 2020 or 2021. Accordingly, points for her 16th best result are deducted instead.

Withdrawn players 
The following players would have been seeded, but withdrew before the tournament began.

Other entry information

Wild cards

Protected ranking

Qualifiers

Lucky losers

Withdrawals 

 – not included on entry list& – withdrew from entry list

Explanatory notes

See also 
2022 Australian Open – Day-by-day summaries
2022 WTA Tour
International Tennis Federation

References

External links
Draw information

Women's Singles
2022
2022 in Australian women's sport
2022 WTA Tour
2022 in women's tennis